Esertepe Aqua Center is a multifunctional project of famous Turkish architect Günay Erdem located at Esertepe, Ankara which includes various recreational and sports activities based on water usage.

Concept and design

Quick facts 
Total plot area: 6,400 m2
Total buildings area: 5,000 m2
Functions: Olympic swimming pool, tropical beach, diving pool, restaurant, cafeteria, baths, wellness
Project cost: $10 million

External links 
 Official web site
 Erdem Architects official Facebook page 
 Gunay Erdem-Arkitera
 Turkish architects entrusted the future of New York
 Architects Of Future
 Turkish architects design peace islands to replace La Spezia war arsenal
 Erdem Architects Gets First Prize in La Spezia Arsenale 2062 Competition 
 Identify a Public Space

References 

Sports venues in Ankara